Dual City Sessions was conceived in 2007 as a traveling exhibition featuring designers from two cities, and has been showcased at DesignTide Tokyo, Singapore Design Festival, DMY Berlin Festival, Shanghai Design Biennial and Alt Space Tokyo.

The exhibition presents itself as a platform for international collaboration and cross-pollination of diverse creative disciplines - to showcase efforts between two cities, bringing together emerging and innovative practitioners in the fields of art, fashion, music and design.

Conceived by art director Felix Ng of design studio SILNT, the exhibition has collaborated with Japanese design studio artless and architect Shuzo Okabe.

2007 - Null
Each country’s team of artists work based on the themes of nature, architecture and other items symbolic of their country. Using only two elements in monochrome, the artworks are conceived, designed and constructed personally by each artist.

The participating Japanese and Singaporean artists – 28 in total – will each render their theories on two -long original prints. When connected, the individual pieces become one artwork, inspired by and representative not only of Japanese beauty and culture but also of the connection between human and nature

Participating artists (Singapore) 
 Choy Ka Fai (of TheatreWorks / KYTV)
 Christopher Lee (The Asylum design studio)
 Daniel Koh (Unit)
 Felix Ng (SILNT)
 Grace Tan (kwodrent)
 Hanson Ho (H55)
 Hjgher
 Junkflea
 &Larry
 Mei (The Analog Girl)
 ND Chow (Angle)
 Shu (SILNT)
 Steve Lawler (Mojoko)
 Tom Merckx (Me and Mister Jones)

Participating artists (Japan)
 Akira Osawa
 Hideki Owa
 Hikaru Koike
 Hiroshi Sato (Semitransparent Design)
 Kei Kawakami (asobigraphic)
 Keigo Anan (tngrm)
 Koji Nishida (raku-gaki.com)
 Momoko Kawakami
 Shun Kawakami (artless)
 Tadashi Ura (gleamix)
 Taisuke Koyama
 Takashi Kamada (.spfdesign)
 Yu-ki Sakurai (mokuva)
 +39 / K.Tozaki (Karatesystem)

2008 - Art with Sound
Art with Sound is a cross-disciplinary collaboration between designers and musicians from Japan and Singapore. The exhibition brings together the complexities of the two disciplines, both innate and compelling to each other. The exhibition was showcased at DMY International Design Festival (Berlin, Germany), Shanghai Design Biennial and Alt Space in Tokyo.

Participating artists (Japan)
Artless + Noiselessly
Adapter + The Samos
Merry + Leo Sato
Raku-Gaki + Soothe
Tycoon graphics + Merce Death

Participating artists (Singapore)
4femmes + Fugusan
Djohan + Fezz
SILNT + Muon
Steve Lawler + AntiGravityChocolate
Victor Low + Phunk Studio

References

External links
Official website
Shift.jp.org
Culturepush.com
Antenna7.com
Designtaxi.com
Timeoutsingapore.com

Traveling exhibits
Design events
Graphic design